Marte Wulff is a Norwegian singer-songwriter.

Discography

Albums

References

External links
 

Year of birth missing (living people)
Living people
Norwegian women singers
Norwegian pop singers
English-language singers from Norway
Propeller Recordings artists
Universal Music Group artists